Scyllarides is a genus of slipper lobsters.

Characteristics
Scyllarides is placed in the subfamily Arctidinae, which is differentiated from other subfamilies by the presence of multiarticulated exopods on all three maxillipeds, and a three-segmented palp on the mandible. The only other genus in the subfamily, Arctides, is distinguished by having a more highly sculptured carapace, with an extra spine behind each eye, and a transverse groove on the first segment of the abdomen.

Taxonomic history
In 1849, Wilhem de Haan divided the genus Scyllarus into two genera, Scyllarus and Arctus, but made the error of including the type species of Scyllarus in the genus Arctus. This was first recognised by the ichthyologist Theodore Gill in 1898, who synonymised Arctus with Scyllarus, and erected a new genus Scyllarides to hold the species that De Haan had placed in Scyllarus.

Species
Scyllarides comprises the following extant species:

Scyllarides aequinoctialis (Lund, 1793)
Scyllarides astori Holthuis, 1960
Scyllarides brasiliensis Rathbun, 1906
Scyllarides deceptor Holthuis, 1963
Scyllarides delfosi Holthuis, 1960
Scyllarides elisabethae (Ortmann, 1894)
Scyllarides haanii (De Haan, 1841)
Scyllarides herklotsii (Herklots, 1851)
Scyllarides latus (Latreille, 1802)
Scyllarides nodifer (Stimpson, 1866)
Scyllarides obtusus Holthuis, 1993 
Scyllarides roggeveeni Holthuis, 1967
Scyllarides squammosus (H. Milne-Edwards, 1837)
Scyllarides tridacnophaga Holthuis, 1967

In addition, two extinct species of Scyllarides are known from the Eocene of Europe:
Scyllarides bolcensis de Angeli & Garassino, 2008 
Scyllarides tuberculatus (König, 1825)

References

Achelata
Extant Ypresian first appearances

pl:Łopaciarz